Canada 12d black or The Black Empress of Canada is the rarest Canadian postage stamp, issued in 1851. The 12-pence stamp shows the portrait of Queen Victoria and is the third stamp issued by the province.

History 
In 1851, the Province of Canada issued the stamps of Queen Victoria. For the stamp image, the Queen's portrait by Alfred Edward Chalon (1780–1860) was used. This design is called the Chalon head. The stamps were printed in New York.

In fine and unused condition, these stamps are very expensive. In February 2006, a Twelve Penny Black was sold £116,000.

The first issue of stamps for the colony of Canada was made in 1851 and comprised three pence, six pence, and 12 pence values. One shilling was not used as the face value because in local currency it had more than one meaning of value. In New England one shilling meant 16 and two-thirds cents, which was equal to 10 pence. In New York shilling meant 12 and a half cents equalling seven pence halfpenny. Therefore 12 pence offered no misunderstanding. Out of 51,000 of the 12 pence black that were printed, about 130 copies of this philatelic item are believed to exist today. There are only five unused pairs and two used pairs.

See also 
 Canada 2c Large Queen on laid paper
 List of postage stamps
 Penny Black
 Penny Lilac
 Penny Red
 Postage stamps and postal history of Canada
 Two Penny Blue

Notes

References

External links 
 Canada 12d black value 
 
 

Postage stamps of Canada
Cultural depictions of Queen Victoria
1851 introductions